Eliza Rowdon Hall (26 November 1847 – 14 February 1916) was an Australian philanthropist.

Born Eliza Rowdon Kirk, she married the Sydney businessman Walter Russell Hall in Melbourne in April 1874. After Walter's death in 1911, Eliza, who was childless, founded The Walter and Eliza Hall Trust that led to the establishment of the Walter and Eliza Hall Institute of Medical Research, using funds earned from Hall's business interests to establish the Trust. Grants from the Trust led to the establishment of the Walter and Eliza Hall Institute of Medical Research.

References

External links

1847 births
1916 deaths
Australian women philanthropists
Philanthropists from Melbourne
19th-century Australian women
20th-century Australian women
19th-century Australian philanthropists
19th-century women philanthropists